"You've Got Me to Hold On To" is a song written by Dave Loggins, and recorded by American country music artist Tanya Tucker.   It was released in April 1976 as the second single from the album Lovin' and Learnin'.  The song reached number 3 on the Billboard Hot Country Singles & Tracks chart.

Cover versions 
Anne Murray also covered the song, including it on her 1979 album I'll Always Love You.

Charts

Weekly charts

Year-end charts

References

1976 songs
1976 singles
Tanya Tucker songs
Anne Murray songs
Songs written by Dave Loggins
Song recordings produced by Jerry Crutchfield
MCA Records singles